Retrofuture is the sixth studio album by Tiger Army, and the second with producer Ted Hutt, and was released on September 13, 2019. Lead vocalist Nick 13 said the album had a more stripped and guitar-driven production than the band's previous releases. They also say they used vintage equipment in the recording to get a retro 1950s sound.

Track listing

Personnel
 Greg Calbi – mastering
 Keith Cooper – backing vocals
 Djordje Stijepovic – standup bass
 Mike Fasano – drums
 Linas Garsys – artwork
 Ben Grey – backing vocals
 Ted Hutt – acoustic guitar, mixing, producer, shaker, tambourine
 Sergie Loobkoff – artwork
 Ryan Mall – engineer
 Don Nemarnik – technician
 Nick 13 – composer, guitar, vocals
 Skinhead Rob – backing vocals
 Jason Stockwell – technician
 Dave Whiston – guitar technician

Charts

References

2020 albums
Tiger Army albums
Rise Records albums